CJ Conradie is a South African rugby union player for the  in the Currie Cup. His regular position is hooker.

Conradie was named in the  squad for the Super Rugby Unlocked competition and the 2020–21 Currie Cup Premier Division.

References

South African rugby union players
Living people
Rugby union hookers
Griquas (rugby union) players
1995 births